Morris Silverman (1894–1972) was a Conservative rabbi as well as a writer.

Biography
Silverman was born on November 19, 1894 in Newburgh, New York, the son of Lena (Friedland) and Simon Silverman, who were Russian Jewish immigrants. He edited the High Holiday Prayer Book, popularly known as the "Silverman Machzor" in 1939 which became the official prayer book for Rosh Hashanah and Yom Kippur for the United Synagogue of America of the Conservative Movement for over half a century. He published it through his publishing company, Prayer Book Press, now a subsidiary of Media Judaica. 

Silverman edited the Sabbath and Festival Prayer Book, which was the official prayer book for the Conservative movement until the late 1980s. 

Silverman's primary literary output was liturgical books, many of which he co-wrote with his son, Rabbi Hillel E. Silverman, including Siddurenu, a prayer book for school children, a prayer book for summer camps, a haggadah for the Passover Seder.

Silverman was the long-time Rabbi of The Emanuel Synagogue, a Conservative synagogue in West Hartford, Connecticut.

He came from a family of clergy and writers.  His wife, Althea H. (Osber), wrote many children's books and his son Rabbi Hillel continues to write Judaic books. His grandson is actor Jonathan Silverman. His great-nephew, Richard Sillman, was the youngest (among the first) cable TV directors in the United States.

Awards
Silverman was a 1953 recipient of the George Washington Honor Medal from Freedoms Foundation at Valley Forge for Editorial.

References

1894 births
1972 deaths
American Conservative rabbis
20th-century American rabbis
People from Orange County, New York